Cowboy Mountain is a 5,853-foot-elevation (1,784 meter) mountain summit located in northeast King County of Washington state. It is situated at Stevens Pass, on land managed by Mount Baker-Snoqualmie National Forest. This mountain is best known for ski runs on its north slopes which are part of the Stevens Pass Ski Area. Cowboy Mountain is part of the Chiwaukum Mountains, which are a subset of the Cascade Range. Its nearest higher neighbor is Big Chief Mountain,  to the northeast, and the Pacific Crest Trail passes through the saddle between these two mountains. Precipitation runoff from the peak drains into headwaters of the Tye River, which in turn is a tributary of the Skykomish River. The longest railroad tunnel in the United States, the Cascade Tunnel, was bored directly under Cowboy Mountain, as a response to deadly avalanches that threatened trains of the Great Northern Railway. The deadliest avalanche in the history of the United States, the 1910 Wellington avalanche, occurred approximately two miles west of Cowboy Mountain.

Climate

Cowboy Mountain is located in the marine west coast climate zone of western North America. Most weather fronts originate in the Pacific Ocean, and travel northeast toward the Cascade Mountains. As fronts approach, they are forced upward by the peaks of the Cascade Range, causing them to drop their moisture in the form of rain or snowfall onto the Cascades (Orographic lift). As a result, the west side of the Cascades experiences high precipitation, especially during the winter months in the form of snowfall. During winter months, weather is usually cloudy, but, due to high pressure systems over the Pacific Ocean that intensify during summer months, there is often little or no cloud cover during the summer. Because of maritime influence, snow tends to be wet and heavy, resulting in high avalanche danger.

See also

 Stevens Pass Ski Area
 Jim Hill Mountain

References

External links
 Weather forecast: Cowboy Mountain

Mountains of Washington (state)
Mountains of King County, Washington
Cascade Range
Mount Baker-Snoqualmie National Forest
North American 1000 m summits